The Future Africa Leaders Award (FALA), is an annual prize awarded to 10 African youths who have contributed significantly in their local communities through innovation, societal education on local and global issues, developing solutions to combat societal issues, advocacy, social education and societal awareness. Each winner is given a grant of 10,000 USD and an outstanding winner among the 10 is given an additional 25,000 USD. Since inception, 110 youths from 28 countries have won this Award out of thousands of entries reviewed each year. 

Each year, the Award holds 31st December into the New Year with all recipients in attendance physically in Nigeria. Since 2018, the ceremony has been chaired by Former Nigerian President Olusegun Obasanjo, with keynote speakers such as Madame President Ellen Johnson Sirleaf of Liberia, President Goodluck Jonathan of Nigeria, Dr. Arikana Chihombori-Quao , Solomon Dalung and Nobel Peace Laureate Leymah Roberta Gbowee in attendance. 

Since inception, $1.35 million of grant has been given to 110 recipients from 28 African countries.  

In 2023, the Future Africa Leaders Foundation donated 500 million naira to the development of the Olusegun Obasanjo Presidential Library in Ogun State, Nigeria.

Background 

The Future Africa Leaders Award was established in 2013 and is organized every year by the Future Africa Leaders Foundation, a sub-organization of the Chris Oyakhilome Foundation International (COFI).  The Award recognizes the role of young leaders as drivers of progress and development in Africa, and therefore only youths in Africa between the ages of 16 - 23 qualify as recipients. The selection process commences within the year where entries are submitted on the Foundation's official website, after which a review and verification process is initiated till a final list of 30 is shortlisted and presented. 

It is awarded to 10 youths each year across Africa between the ages of 16 - 23 by the patron of the foundation and host of the Award ceremony, Pastor Chris Oyakhilome.

Star Prize Winners 

Among the ten winners each year who receive $10,000, a star prize winner emerges from them receiving an additional $25,000. Below are a list of the star prize winners each year:

References 

African awards
Awards established in 2013
Governance and civic leadership awards